Jackson Brewing Company, or Jackson Brewery, was a regional brewery operating in New Orleans, from 1890 to 1974. One of two breweries selling Jax beer, along with Jacksonville's Jax Brewing Company, it was popularly known as the Jax Brewery. At its height, it was the largest brewery in the Southern United States.

Its French Quarter building is now a historic landmark in New Orleans and houses restaurants, apartments, and entertainment venues.

History

The brewery was founded by Lawrence Fabacher in 1890 as Jackson Bohemian Brewery; its name was later changed to Jax Beer and finally Jackson Brewing Company, after Andrew Jackson and Jackson Square. It soon grew to be a prominent regional brewery and it, along with Dixie, were the only New Orleans breweries to survive Prohibition.

In 1935, Jackson Brewing Company entered a legal dispute with Jacksonville Brewing Company over the "Jax Beer" trademark, used by both companies. This resulted in a compromise in which Jacksonville Brewing Company got exclusive rights to sell in Florida, Georgia, South Carolina, and North Carolina, while Jackson Brewing got states to the west. Jackson Brewing expanded in the 1940s, as demand increased. In the 1950s, the company suffered competition from the growing national breweries. In 1954, it bought exclusive rights to the Jax trademark from the Jacksonville company, which ended brewing operations. This move made Jackson Brewing the 10th largest brewery in the U.S. and the largest in the South. 

In 1974, Jackson Brewing entered financial straits and was acquired by Pearl Brewing Company. Pearl continued producing Jax Beer until 1984, when it was acquired by Pabst Brewing Company and took on Pabst branding.

The brewery building remains a landmark in New Orleans. After brewing operations ceased, the building was purchased and turned into space for residences, shops, and restaurants.

In popular culture 
In Tennessee Williams' 1947 play A Streetcar Named Desire, character Steve Hubbell orders a Jax Beer in Act 1, Scene 1.

See also
List of breweries in Louisiana
Jackson Brewing Company (San Francisco)
List of defunct breweries in the United States

References

Buildings and structures in New Orleans
Defunct brewing companies based in Louisiana
Defunct brewery companies of the United States
French Quarter
Landmarks in Louisiana
Food and drink companies of New Orleans
Manufacturing companies based in New Orleans
Shopping malls in Louisiana
Tourist attractions in New Orleans
1890 establishments in Louisiana
1974 disestablishments in Louisiana
Defunct manufacturing companies based in Louisiana